, better known as Tokido, is a Japanese fighting game player who plays the King of Fighters and Street Fighter franchises. He is known for playing multiple fighting games on a competitive level in addition to Street Fighter, including Tekken, Marvel vs Capcom 3, and BlazBlue. Tokido is a three-time EVO champion, having won Capcom vs. SNK 2 in 2002 as well as winning Super Street Fighter II Turbo in 2007 and Street Fighter V ten years later. Tokido has had 19+ Evolution top 8 finishes in 9 different games across 15 years, a feat surpassed only by Justin Wong.

Career
Tokido was introduced to fighting games in the 1990s, when he played The King of Fighters '94 on the Neo Geo MVS. The first Street Fighter game Tokido came in contact with was Street Fighter 2 on the Super Famicom.

At CEO 2011 he took 1st place in Super Street Fighter 4 and Marvel vs Capcom 3 and took 3rd place in Tekken 6. Sponsored by Madcatz, Tokido was a highly successful King of Fighters XIII player in 2014. Tokido got into Street Fighter IV late compared to other high-level players. When he did, teammate Daigo Umehara suggested he pick the character Akuma, as a character like Ryu would be too difficult for him. Playing as Akuma, Tokido invented the "Tokido Vortex", a move that guarantees an opponent character will take damage.

A few months before Street Fighter V was released in February 2016, Tokido expressed a desire to make a change in his playstyle. Playing with a "more fundamental, grounded style" did not work out well at the 2015 Tokyo Game Show tournament, but he did win the 2015 Canada Cup a month later. The change in style prepared Tokido to use Ryu in Street Fighter V, as the game did not include Akuma at that point. Tokido reached second place multiple times during the 2016 Capcom Pro Tour, losing only to Infiltration at Final Round 19 and NorCal Regionals 2016. Tokido would eventually defeat Infiltration at the 2016 Community Effort Orlando in order to qualify for the Capcom Cup.

Tokido was released from Mad Catz in 2016, as the company was having financial trouble due to the poor sales of Rock Band 4. On January 4, 2017, it was confirmed that Echo Fox had picked up Tokido.

After his signature character Akuma was released for Street Fighter V, Tokido would go on to win the game's tournament at Evo 2017.

Legacy
In 2016, a Yahoo Esports article described Tokido as a "fighting game legend," as a veteran of numerous battles spanning over a decade. Tokido is considered to be one of Japan's five "fighting game gods", a title he shares with Daigo Umehara, Shinya Onuki, Tatsuya Haitani, and Naoto Sako.

Tokido is known for taking on a somewhat eccentric persona on stage. Footage exists of Tokido imitating some of Akuma's taunts, and trash-talking his opponent Bonchan shortly before a tournament in 2015 became highly discussed among the fighting game community. In 2015, Tokido stated that he is meaning to leave such behavior behind him because, as a professional gamer, he wants "to show that entertainment in game, not out of it."

Achievements

References

Fighting game players
Japanese esports players
Echo Fox players
Ryukyuan people
1985 births
Living people
Street Fighter players
Virtua Fighter players